Andrew Steven Mondshein (born February 28, 1957) is an American film editor and director with more than 25 motion picture credits. He was widely recognized for his editing of the film The Sixth Sense (M. Night Shyamalan, 1999); he was nominated for the Academy Award, the BAFTA Award, the ACE Eddie, and he won the Satellite Award.

Life and career
Mondshein grew up on the east coast of the United States, and received a bachelor's degree from the University of Florida. His first credits are as an assistant editor on two 1982 films directed by Sidney Lumet, Deathtrap and The Verdict. He went on to edit five of Lumet's films between 1984 and 1992. Mondshein was among the first film editors to adopt electronic techniques (on the film Power (Lumet-1986)).

Mondshein has had a notable collaboration on eleven films with the Swedish director Lasse Hallström. Their collaboration commenced with Hallström's first English language film Once Around (1991). It includes Chocolat (2000), which was nominated for the Academy Award for Best Picture, and for which Mondshein was nominated for a second Eddie. Their most recent collaboration is The Hundred-Foot Journey (2014). Because of his concurrent work on The Sixth Sense, Mondshein played only a peripheral role in Hallström's The Cider House Rules (1999); Lisa Zeno Churgin edited that film, which was nominated for seven Academy Awards including Film Editing.

Mondshein has been elected to membership in the American Cinema Editors.

Filmography

Feature films

Television

Documentary

See also
List of film director and editor collaborations

References

External links
 

American film editors
American Cinema Editors
University of Florida alumni
Living people
1957 births